Okondja Airport  is an airport serving Okondja in Haut-Ogooué Province, Gabon.

See also

 List of airports in Gabon
 Transport in Gabon

References

External links
 HERE/Nokia - Okondja
 OurAirports - Okondja
 OpenStreetMap - Okondja
 Google Maps - Okondja

Airports in Gabon